"Paradise" is a song by English singer-songwriter George Ezra. The song was written by Ezra and Shane Marriott and produced by Cam Blackwood. It was released to digital retailers on 19 January 2018, as the second single from Ezra's second studio album Staying at Tamara's (2018). A music video was released the following week, on 24 January. Ezra performed the track live for the first time on The Graham Norton Show on 2 February 2018.

The song reached the top ten in Austria, Belgium, Ireland, and the United Kingdom, and also peaked at number one in Scotland.

Background
Ezra said the song was aiming to capture "a feeling that takes over when you've fallen in love", and was dedicated to his girlfriend and the early days of their relationship. He explained that the song's lyrics were "not looking at a particular love story, but more the effect that love has on your psyche. You become a mess, but it's good. It doesn't matter what's going on around you - you're in your own little world", and described "Paradise" as the "perfect love song version" of Staying at Tamara's themes of "escaping and dreaming and taking yourself away a little bit".

Composition
According to the sheet music published at Musicnotes.com by Alfred Publishing Co., Inc, the song is written in the time signature of common time, with a tempo of 140 beats per minute. "Paradise" is composed in the key of B major while George Ezra's vocal range spans from the low-note of B3 to B5.

Personnel
Credits adapted from Tidal.

 George Ezra – composition, lyrics, vocals, keyboard, bass guitar, guitar
 Cam Blackwood – production, guitar, percussion, piano, programming, synthesizer
 Joel Davies – mix engineering
 Charles Hicks – mix engineering
 Dan Grech-Marguerat – mix engineering, programming
 Dave Kutch – mastering engineer
 Liam Thorne – engineering, programming
 Florrie Arnold – background vocals, drums
 Matthew Racher – drums, percussion, programming

Charts

Weekly charts

Year-end charts

Decade-end charts

Certifications

References

2018 singles
2017 songs
Songs written by George Ezra
George Ezra songs
Number-one singles in Scotland
Song recordings produced by Cam Blackwood